Juhani Repo (born 9 January 1948) is a Finnish cross-country skier. He competed at the 1972 Winter Olympics and the 1976 Winter Olympics.

Cross-country skiing results

Olympic Games

References

External links
 

1948 births
Living people
Finnish male cross-country skiers
Olympic cross-country skiers of Finland
Cross-country skiers at the 1972 Winter Olympics
Cross-country skiers at the 1976 Winter Olympics
People from Iisalmi
Sportspeople from North Savo
20th-century Finnish people